Gandosso is a comune (municipality) in the Province of Bergamo in the Italian region of Lombardy, located about  northeast of Milan and about  southeast of Bergamo.

Gandosso borders the following municipalities: Carobbio degli Angeli, Castelli Calepio, Credaro, Grumello del Monte, Trescore Balneario.

References